Friedrichsfelde Ost is a railway station in the Marzahn district of Berlin. The station is located north of the district border to Friedrichsfelde at the intersection of the route of the Prussian Eastern Railway with the Rhinstraße and is served by three lines of the Berlin S-Bahn.

Operation

References

Berlin S-Bahn stations
Buildings and structures in Lichtenberg
Buildings and structures in Marzahn-Hellersdorf
Railway stations in Berlin
Railway stations in Germany opened in 1903
Railway stations in Germany opened in 1979
1979 establishments in East Germany